The Legend of the North Wind is a 1992 Spanish animated fantasy film directed by Juan Bautista Berasategi (originally credited to Maite Ruiz de Austri and Carlos Varela). It was based upon a story by Gregorio Muro and Josean Muñoz, and produced by Episa and Euskal Pictures International.

It was produced in the Spain under the working title of Balleneros (Basque title: Balearenak), before being released in 1992 as La leyenda del viento del Norte (Sp), La légende du vent du nord (Fr), and Ipar haizearen erronka (Basque).

Originally, the released film was credited to Maite Ruiz de Austri and Carlos Varela, but Berasategi sued the producers for plagiarism, charging that the majority of the film was developed under his direction, and that Ruiz de Austri and Varela had received undue credit for what was actually his work. Berasategi eventually won the case, and received legal recognition as the film's director. This is reflected on more recent releases of the film, in which the original director credit is replaced with a new credit for Berasategi.

An English-dubbed version was not released until 1997 in North America as direct to video by Plaza Entertainment and Nelvana in 1997.

The Spanish release was followed by a 13-episode TV series, and a 1994 sequel called El regreso del Viento del Norte, or The Return of the North Wind.

Synopsis
To get his hands on a valuable pod of whales, a 17th-century European daredevil in Newfoundland foolishly attempts to release the powers of the mythical North Wind, who was trapped in a pot thanks to a shared effort by Basque sailors and Mi'kmaq Indians. Now, the descendant of those Indians, Watuna, and the descendants of those Basque sailors, Ane and Peiot, must defeat the evil Athanasius before he achieves his purpose.

Voice cast

Basque version (original version)
 Xabier Eguzkiza as the Narrator
 Xebe Atencia as Pello
 Asun Iturriagagoitia as Ane
 Luz Enparanza as Watuna
 Xabier Eguzkiza as Captain Galar
 Kepa Cueto as The North Wind/Athanasius
 Xabier Ponbo as Bakailu
 Aitor Larrañaga as Martin
 Tere Jaioas The Sea

Spanish version
 Damián Velasco
 Chelo Vivares
 Gonzalo Durán
 Vicente Gisbert
 Isabel Fernández
 María José Castro
 Ángela María Romero
 Amparo Climent
 Teófilo Martínez
 Pedro Sempson
 José Carabias
 Daniel Dicenta
 Eduardo Jover
 José María Martín

English version
 Sonja Ball as Anne
 Teddy Lee Dillon as Elliot
 Daniel Brochu as Watuna
 A.J. Henderson as Captain Galar
 Terrence Scammell as The North Wind/Athanasius
 Rick Jones as Barnaby
 Richard M. Dumont as Martin
 Pierre Lenoir as The Mi'kmaq Chief
 Gary Jewell as Mr. Blackburn (credited as "Ship Owner")
 Kathleen Fee as The Sea

References

External links
 
 
 
 A page with cast/crew credits and synopsis

1992 films
1992 animated films
1992 fantasy films
Basque-language films
1990s Spanish-language films
Films about Native Americans
Films set in the 17th century
Films set in Newfoundland and Labrador
Spanish children's films
Spanish animated films
Spanish animated fantasy films
Film controversies
Films involved in plagiarism controversies
Nelvana films